Pacific Data Images (PDI) was an American computer animation production company based in Redwood City, California, that was bought by DreamWorks SKG in 2000. It was renamed PDI/DreamWorks and was owned by DreamWorks Animation.

Founded in 1980 by Carl Rosendahl, PDI was one of the pioneers of computer animation. It produced over 700 commercials, contributed visual effects to more than 70 feature films, and produced and contributed to many of DreamWorks Animation's films, beginning with DreamWorks' first animated film   Antz (1998). PDI's final animated film before its closure on January 22, 2015 was Penguins of Madagascar (2014).

History

1980–1987: Early years 
PDI was founded in 1980 by Carl Rosendahl with a loan of $25,000 from his father. He was joined in 1981 by Richard Chuang and in 1982 by Glenn Entis. Richard and Glenn wrote the foundation of the in-house computer animation software that was to be used for the next two decades. They started work on 3D software at the end of 1981, and 3D production started in the fall of 1982. The initial goal of the company was "Entertainment using 3D computer animation".

The first computer at PDI was a DEC PDP 11/44 with 128 kilobytes of memory. This was a lot of memory given that the computer had only 64 kilobytes (16-bits) of address space. It had a 20 megabyte disk. Attached to this was a $65,000 framebuffer which had a resolution of 512×512 and was 32 bits deep.

The first 3D image rendered at PDI was done on March 12, 1982. The image was simply a 4 by 4 by 4 grid of spheres of varying colors. The spheres were not polygonal, they were implicitly rendered and were fully anti-aliased. The resulting image was 512 by 480 by 24 (8 bits for red, green and blue channels) which took 2 minutes to render.

The PDP-11 was soon replaced by a DEC VAX-11/780 and later PDI shifted to another superminicomputer called the Ridge 32. This machine was 2–4 times faster than the VAX-11/780 at a fraction of the cost.

The original in-house software evolved into a large suite of tools which included a polygon scan-line renderer (called p2r), an interactive animation program (called e-motion), an animation scripting / scene-description language (called script) and a lighting tool (called led). All of these tools were written in C and deployed on a variety of machines running various flavors of Unix.

The initial investment to start the company was $250,000, about $600,000 in 2005 dollars. Its original offices were in Sunnyvale, California working out of a garage owned by Carl's father. PDI moved to its first real offices in 1985 (Sunnyvale), to its second offices in 1995 (Palo Alto) and to its last location in Redwood City at the Pacific Shores Center in 2002. The growth of the company was financed solely through profit. The company was run as an open book; monthly financial reviews were shared with the entire company, and a detailed monthly financial report was released. Money was never taken out of the company which maintained a 7% investment in R&D. PDI was debt-free when acquired by DreamWorks in 2000.

PDI's first client was Rede Globo, Brazil's largest TV network. This gave PDI the major client they needed to fund the creation of most of its early software. This also sent PDI into the business of TV motion graphics and logo animation. PDI designed some early show openings and other special projects for Rede Globo. The software written was also given to Rede Globo and is the only time the in-house software was given to another company. The contract ended in the mid-1980s, but Rede Globo continued to use the software until 1989.

Most of the 1980s were spent creating broadcast graphics for most television networks around the world. PDI was working concurrently for ABC, CBS, NBC, HBO, Cinemax, MTV, VH1, TNT , Nine Network Australia, Sky One and Showtime. PDI focused on direct to video production as opposed to film output being done at other early studios. PDI modified the interface to a Sony BVH-2000 using parts put together from a trip to a toy store in order to do single-frame recording. All the rendering was done on fields at 60 or 50 frames per second (depending on the video broadcasting standard used locally).

PDI controlled a large percentage of this market during this time and they were the first mass producer of computer animation. One year producing two major networks' graphics packages meant specifically rendered images for over 400 local television stations. Some of the early production contracts included Globo, Entertainment Tonight (produced for Harry Marks), ABC Sports 84 Olympic promos, and NBC News.

PDI worked with Atari, also in Sunnyvale, in the early 1980s on a couple of projects. In 1982, Rosendahl was hired to set up and calibrate Atari's computer animation film recorder system that would be used for video game footage in Superman III.

PDI planned and proposed a feature-length CG animation film in 1985, but they were unable to raise the funding needed to produce it.

PDI outlived all the other computer graphics studios that existed in the early 1980s. One of the reasons for this is that PDI never went into significant debt by purchasing expensive hardware. While other studios purchased or leased supercomputers, PDI bought cheaper hardware, treating it as a commodity which would soon be replaced, enabling lower operating costs.

1987–1990: Transition 

PDI's early focus was on network TV productions since they captured over 50% of that market in 1985. However, in 1990, PDI introduced the digital film scanning process. This process was used to popularize automated rig removal and image touch-up. PDI was also instrumental in introducing performance animation for theme parks, ads and movies. This started with a joint project in 1988 with Jim Henson's Creature Shop on a real-time performance character named Waldo C. Graphic for The Jim Henson Hour (1989).

During these years of transition, PDI moved away from the motion graphics market and focused their attention on commercials and 3D visual effects for feature films. Notable among the commercials was the first Pillsbury Doughboy created in CG. Pillsbury was the first company to move an established icon to CG. Before this, all previous animated commercials were done with stop-motion. Other notable commercials include the "Bud Bowl" and "Scrubbing Bubbles" spots.

Early in the 1990s, Thaddeus Beier and Shawn Neely developed a method for morphing that resulted in a much more natural and expressive morph. This technique is called "feature-based morphing". PDI used this technology to create various well-known sequences, including the Exxon car-into-tiger morph and the extended morph at the end of the "Black or White" music video from Michael Jackson. These morphing jobs were easy to do with PDI's software and the effect was in high demand. The algorithms invented by Beier and Neely were published at the annual SIGGRAPH conference and are now the basis of most image morphing tools. For many people, their first exposure to these algorithms was the SGI IRIX software called "Elastic Reality". PDI also did the opening sequence for the 1990s revival of the classic game show, Let's Make a Deal.

PDI broke into the feature film visual effects business with contributions to Terminator 2 (1991), Toys (1992), Angels in the Outfield (1994),  Batman Forever (1995), and The Arrival (1996). At the time, the strengths of PDI included character animation, lip synch, rendering effects, the aforementioned rig removal and cleanup, and performance animation.

During this era PDI transitioned from the Ridge32 computer to SGI workstations running IRIX. They were not alone in this transition as most of the industry followed suit.

1990–1995: Character animation 
Early in 1990, Tim Johnson and Rex Grignon officially formed PDI's Character Animation Group with the mandate to develop a group of artists with the creative and technical skills needed to produce a feature-length CG-animated film. The group originally consisted of Johnson, Grignon, Raman Hui, Glenn McQueen, Beth Hofer, Dick Walsh, Karen Schneider and Eric Darnell. Under this group, PDI's commercial character animation skills grew and numerous notable short films were produced. Among these are Gas Planet (1992), Sleepy Guy (1994), Brick-a-Brac (1995), Gabola the Great (1997), Fishing (1999) and Fat Cat on a Diet (1999).

This character group set the company off in a new direction that set the basis for development goals during this period. The short films were a way to develop animation techniques as well as being a test bed for software and pipeline procedures and flow.

PDI allowed animators to pursue individual products and shorts. This produced several award-winning short films in this category. Some of the more notable productions are Opera Industrial (1986), Chromosaurus, Cosmic Zoom (1985), Burning Love (1988), and Locomotion (1989).

By 1992, PDI was looking for a partner to produce feature-length animated films. In the meantime, the company (with help from Lucasfilm's Industrial Light & Magic) worked on the 1991 TV special The Last Halloween for Hanna-Barbera Productions, which won them an Emmy Award for the CG characters in the otherwise live-action special. This turned into PDI's first 3D Character Animation pipeline. Using this pipeline, they created a 3D stereo Daffy Duck for Warner Bros. and a CG Homer and Bart Simpson for the "Homer3" segment of the 1995 The Simpsons episode "Treehouse of Horror VI".

The result of all these projects was a movie deal with DreamWorks SKG in 1995 to make the movie Antz. At this time DreamWorks purchased a 40% share of PDI.

Glen Entis left PDI for the game industry in 1995, first joining DreamWorks Interactive as CEO. When Electronic Arts purchased DreamWorks Interactive, he moved to their Vancouver office to set up their next-generation games research group. He is a founding board member of Los Angeles' Digital Coast Roundtable, and is chairman of the Academy of Interactive Arts & Sciences.

1995–2015: Feature films and closure 
PDI's first feature film Antz was released by DreamWorks Pictures on October 2, 1998. This was followed by Shrek on May 18, 2001.

After the success of Antz, in 2000 Carl Rosendahl sold his remaining interest in PDI to DreamWorks. PDI was renamed PDI/DreamWorks and continued to operate as a stand-alone business unit. Rosendahl left PDI in February 2000 to become managing director for Mobius Venture Capital, where he focused on investments in the technology and media companies. In May 2001, this sale essentially united the two studios, PDI and DreamWorks, into a single entity which went public a few years later as DreamWorks Animation (DWA). PDI stopped making commercials and visual effects for live-action films in 2002. Animators at PDI worked on projects based at the PDI studio, but also assisted in DWA projects based in the Glendale DWA studio.

By the time PDI reached its 25th anniversary in 2005, it had completed over 1000 projects and grown to over 400 employees.

In 2008, Richard Chuang, the last of the initial three, left the company to pursue his own ventures.

On January 22, 2015, PDI/DreamWorks was shut down as part of its parent company's restructuring plans following the box office underperformance of Penguins of Madagascar (2014), cutting off 500 jobs.

Animated films 
PDI/DreamWorks has produced Antz (1998), Shrek (2001), Shrek 2 (2004), Madagascar (2005), Shrek the Third (2007), Madagascar: Escape 2 Africa (2008), Megamind (2010), Madagascar 3: Europe's Most Wanted (2012), Mr. Peabody & Sherman (2014) and Penguins of Madagascar (2014).  With US$441.2 million in domestic box-office ticket sales, Shrek 2 is currently the fourteenth highest grossing animated film of all time in the United States.

PDI won their only Academy Award for Best Animated Feature Film for Shrek in 2002, which was the first time it was awarded.

Technical awards 
PDI/DreamWorks has won nine Scientific and Technical Academy Awards. The first was awarded to Les Dittert, along with others, in 1994 for work in the area of film scanning. The second was awarded to Carl Rosendahl, Richard Chuang and Glenn Entis in 1997 for the concept and architecture of the PDI animation system. This award in particular recognized their pioneering work in computer animation dating back to the founding of PDI 17 years earlier. Nick Foster was given an award in 1998 for PDI's fluid animation system (flu), and in 2002 Dick Walsh was given one for the development of PDI's Facial Animation System.

In 2010, Eric Tabellion and Arnauld Lamorlette were given one for PDI's global illumination rendering system first used on Shrek 2. This was the first use of global illumination in an animated feature film, a technique which is commonplace today.

In 2013, Lawrence Kesteloot, Drew Olbrich and Daniel Wexler were given an award for PDI's lighting tool, called "light." This tool was developed in 1996 for PDI's first feature film, Antz, and was used until 2015 at PDI and DreamWorks Animation some 25 films later.

In 2015, Scott Peterson, Jeff Budsberg and Jonathan Gibbs were awarded for the studio's foliage (trees and vegetation) system. This system was first used on Shrek and continues to be used today. At the same ceremony, Karl Rasche was awarded along with engineers from HP for his part in the creation of the "DreamColor" monitor.

Richard Chuang, Rahul Thakkar, Mark Kirk and Stewart Birnam, along with DreamWorks engineer Andrew Pilgrim, won a 2016 SciTech technical achievement award for their work on digital movie review systems.

Filmography

Films

Film effects 
PDI contributed visual effects, animation and other services to the following films:

 Electric Dreams (1984)
 Scrooged (1988)
 Ghost (1990) (uncredited)
 Solar Crisis (1990)
 Terminator 2: Judgment Day (1991)
 Freddy's Dead: The Final Nightmare (1991)
 Star Trek VI: The Undiscovered Country (1991)
 The Last Boy Scout (1991) (digital compositing)
 Body Parts (1991) (trailer)
 Freejack (1992) (uncredited)
 Sleepwalkers (1992)
 The Babe (1992)
 Lethal Weapon 3 (1992) (digital compositing)
 Batman Returns (1992)
 Toys (1992)
 Robocop 3 (1993)
 Cliffhanger (1993)
 Dennis the Menace (1993)
 Rookie of the Year (1993)
 Heart and Souls (1993) (Visual effects and title sequence)
 Freaked (1993)
 Carlito's Way (1993)
 Lightning Jack (1994)
 Beverly Hills Cop 3 (1994)
 Angels in the Outfield (1994)
 True Lies (1994)
 Airheads (1994)
 Natural Born Killers (1994)
 The River Wild (1994)
 Double Dragon (1994)
 Speechless (1994)
 Batman Forever (1995)
 Bushwhacked (1995)
 Broken Arrow (1996)
 Executive Decision (1996)
 The Arrival (1996)
 Eraser (1996)
 Batman and Robin (1997)
 A Simple Wish (1997)
 The Peacemaker (1997)
 Titanic (1997)
 Forces of Nature (1999)
 The Out-Of-Towners (1999)
 Supernova (2000)
 Mission: Impossible 2 (2000)
 The Legend of Bagger Vance (2000)
 The Road to El Dorado (2000)
 The Deep End (2001)
 The Mexican (2001)
 Evolution (2001)
 A.I. Artificial Intelligence (2001)
 Minority Report (2002)
 People I Know (2002)
 Sinbad: Legend of the Seven Seas (2003)

Shorts 
 Teddy Bear Maelstrom (1983, Glen Entis)
 Elephant Bubbles (1984, Don Venhaus)
 Max Trax (1985, Adam Chin)
 Botco (1985, PDI Staff)
 Cosmic Zoom (AKA Comic Zoom) (1985, PDI Staff)
 Chromosaurus (1985, Don Venhaus)
 Max's Place (1985, Adam Chin)
 Happy Drinking Birds (1985, Rich Cohen)
 Opéra Industriel (1986, Adam Chin, Rich Cohen)
 Burning Love (1988, Roger Gould, Howard E. Baker)
 Locomotion (1989, Steve Goldberg)
 The Wave (1989, Scott Miller)
 Slide Show (1991, Glenn McQueen)
 Frankie & Johnny (1991, PDI Staff)
 Happy Dog (1992, PDI Character Animation Group)
 Gas Planet (1992, Eric Darnell)
 Big Smoke (1993, Eric Darnell)
 Sleepy Guy (1994, Raman Hui)
 Brick-a-Brac (1995, Cassidy Curtis)
 Gabola The Great (1997, Tim Cheung)
 Basic Insect (1998, Marty Sixkiller)
 Millennium Bug (1998, Lee Lainer)
 Fat Cat On a Diet (1999, Raman Hui)
 Fishing (1999, David Gainey)
 Metropopular (2000, Jonah Hall)
 Shrek in the Swamp Karaoke Dance Party (2001, PDI Staff)
 Sprout (2002, Scott B. Peterson) – Final independent work.
 Far Far Away Idol (2004, PDI Staff)
 The Madagascar Penguins in a Christmas Caper (2005, Gary Trousdale)
 Megamind: The Button of Doom (2011, Simon J. Smith)
 Madly Madagascar (2013, David Soren)
 Rocky & Bullwinkle (2014, Gary Trousdale)

Television specials 
 Shrek the Halls (2007)
 Merry Madagascar (2009)
 Scared Shrekless (2010)

Other work 
 The Jim Henson Hour (Computer Animation) (1989)
 The Last Halloween (Character Animation) (1991)
 Muppet*Vision 3D (1991) (Waldo Character Animation)
 The Simpsons Treehouse of Horror VI (1995) ("Homer3" Segment)
 Marvin the Martian in the Third Dimension (1996) (Theme Park Ride/Short Film)
 Cartoon Sushi (1997) (Gabola The Great Segment)
 Cyberworld 3D (2000) (IMAX film, Antz and The Simpsons segments)
 Shrek 4-D (2003) (Theme Park Ride/Short Film)
 Madagascar: A Crate Adventure (2011) (Theme Park Ride) (animated sequences)

See also 
 Pearl Studio
 DreamWorks Animation
 Shrek (franchise)
 Madagascar (franchise)

References

External links 

  archived on July 25, 2003
 PDI/DreamWorks history at DreamWorks Animation archived on September 27, 2007
 Pacific Data Images & PDI/Dreamworks playlist

American animation studios
DreamWorks Animation
Film production companies of the United States
Visual effects companies
Entertainment companies based in California
Companies based in Redwood City, California
Entertainment companies established in 1980
Entertainment companies disestablished in 2015
1980 establishments in California
2015 disestablishments in California
2000 mergers and acquisitions
American companies established in 1980
American companies disestablished in 2015
Defunct American film studios